The 2017 Orlando City B season was the club's second year of existence, and their second season in the Eastern Conference of the competition then known as the United Soccer League and now as the USL Championship, the second tier of the United States soccer pyramid. It was their first and ultimately only year playing in the new Orlando City Stadium in Downtown Orlando.

This was OCB's final season in the second tier of American soccer as at the end of the year OCB's MLS parent club, Orlando City SC, announced that their USL affiliate would not participate in the 2018 USL season. The team would later announce their intention to become a founding member of the new third-tier USL League One in 2019.

Roster 

On October 18, 2017, OCB declined the options of defenders Zach Ellis-Hayden, Zach Carroll and Timbó; midfielders Jordan Schweitzer, Danny Deakin and Austin Martz; and forward Michael Cox. Additionally, the contracts of goalkeeper Jake Fenlason, defender Scott Thomsen and midfielders Paul Clowes and Lewis Neal expired.

Competitions

USL Regular season

Standings

Match results

References

Orlando City B
Orlando City B
Orlando City B seasons